Get It on Credit is the third studio album by Canadian rock band Toronto, released in 1982. Both original members, Nick Costello and Jim Fox, left the band prior to this release, to be replaced by Gary LaLonde and Barry Connors respectively. LaLonde later joined Honeymoon Suite, while Connors went on to work with Toronto-based quartet Coney Hatch.

The CD release features two bonus tracks that did not make the cut for the original album of 1982: "What About Love" and "Across the Border". "What About Love" was later recorded by Heart in 1985 and would become a Top 10 hit on the Billboard charts.

Track listing

Side 1
 "Break Down the Barricades" (Brian Allen, Holly Woods, Scott Kreyer, Sheron Alton) - 5:08
 "Your Daddy Don't Know" (Geoffrey Iwamoto, Michael Roth) - 3:17
 "Start Tellin' the Truth" (Allen) - 4:27
 "You're a Mystery to Me" (Allen, Jim Vallance, Kreyer) - 3:30
 "Don't Walk Away" (Allen, Vallance, Kreyer) - 4:12

Side 2
"Get It on Credit" (Allen) - 3:19
 "Sick and Tired" (Woods, Kreyer) - 3:00
 "Ya Love ta Love" (Allen) - 4:09
 "Why Can't We Talk?" (Allen) - 3:34
 "Run for Your Life" (Allen, Woods, Kreyer, Alton) - 4:38

CD issue bonus tracks
"What About Love" (Allen, Vallance, Alton) - 3:58
 "Across the Border" (Allen, Woods, Kreyer, Alton) - 3:55

Personnel

Band members
Holly Woods - lead vocals
Sheron Alton - rhythm guitar, backing vocals
Brian Allen - lead guitar
Scott Kreyer - keyboards, backing vocals
Gary LaLonde - bass guitar
Barry Connors - drums

Production
Steve Smith - producer, engineer
Jim Frank - engineer
Mike Baskerville - assistant engineer
Bernie Grundman - mastering
Jim Vallance - arrangements

Charts

Certifications

References

1982 albums
Toronto (band) albums